Ubiquitin specific peptidase 25 is a protein that in humans is encoded by the USP25 gene.

Function

Ubiquitin (MIM 191339) is a highly conserved 76-amino acid protein involved in regulation of intracellular protein breakdown, cell cycle regulation, and stress response. Ubiquitin is released from degraded proteins by disassembly of the polyubiquitin chains, which is mediated by ubiquitin-specific proteases (USPs), such as USP25 (Valero et al., 1999 [PubMed 10644437]).[supplied by OMIM, Mar 2008].

References

Further reading